Tomáš Boháčik (born 25 May 1979 in Brezno) is a Slovak football midfielder who currently plays for the 2. liga club TJ Baník Ružiná.

External links
MFK Košice profile

References

1979 births
Living people
Slovak footballers
Association football midfielders
FC Baník Prievidza players
FK Železiarne Podbrezová players
FC VSS Košice players
MŠK Novohrad Lučenec players
TJ Baník Ružiná players
Slovak Super Liga players
Sportspeople from Brezno